La mer, trois esquisses symphoniques pour orchestre (French for The sea, three symphonic sketches for orchestra), or simply La mer (The Sea), L. 109, CD. 111, is an orchestral composition by the French composer Claude Debussy.

Composed between 1903 and 1905, the piece was premiered in Paris in October 1905. It was initially not well received. Even some who had been strong supporters of Debussy's work were unenthusiastic, even though La mer presented three key aspects of Debussy's aesthetic: Impressionism, Symbolism and Japonism. The work was performed in the US in 1907 and Britain in 1908; after its second performance in Paris, in 1908, it quickly became one of Debussy's most admired and frequently performed orchestral works.

The first audio recording of the work was made in 1928. Since then, orchestras and conductors from around the world have set it down in many studio or live concert recordings.

Background and composition
La mer was the second of Debussy's three orchestral works in three sections, the other being Nocturnes (1892–1899) and Images pour orchestre (1905–1912). The first, the Nocturnes, was premiered in Paris in 1901, and though it had not made any great impact with the public, it was well reviewed by musicians including Paul Dukas, Alfred Bruneau, and Pierre de Bréville. Debussy conceived the idea of a more complex tripartite orchestral piece, and began work in August 1903. He was usually a slow worker, and although the composition of La mer took him more than a year and a half, this was unusually quick progress by his standards, particularly at a time of upheaval in his personal life. He began composing the work while visiting his parents-in-law in Burgundy; by the time it was complete, he had left his wife and was living with Emma Bardac, who was pregnant with Debussy's child.

Debussy retained fond childhood memories of the beauties of the sea, but when composing La mer he rarely visited it, spending most of his time far away from large bodies of water. He drew inspiration from art, "preferring the seascapes available in painting and literature" to the physical sea. Although the detailed scheme of the work changed during its composition, Debussy decided from the outset that it was to be "three symphonic sketches" with the title La mer. In a letter to André Messager, he described the planned sections as "Mère belle aux Îles Sanguinaires", "Jeu de vagues", and "Le vent fait danser la mer". The first of these, inspired by a short story of the same name by Camille Mauclair, was abandoned in favour of a less restrictive theme, the sea from dawn to midday. The last was also dropped, as too reminiscent of ballet, and the less specific theme of the dialogue between the wind and the sea took its place.

Debussy completed La mer on 5 March 1905 and took the proofs to correct on holiday at the Grand Hotel, Eastbourne on the English Channel coast, at which he arrived 23 July 1905; he described Eastbourne to his publisher, Durand, as "a charming peaceful spot: the sea unfurls itself with an utterly British correctness." He arranged the piece for piano four hands in 1905, and in 1909 Durand published a second edition of La mer with the composer's revisions.

Analysis
La mer is scored for 2 flutes, piccolo, 2 oboes, cor anglais, 2 clarinets, 3 bassoons, contrabassoon, 4 French horns, 3 trumpets, 2 cornets, 3 trombones, tuba, timpani, bass drum, cymbals, triangle, tam tam, glockenspiel, 2 harps and strings.

A typical performance of the piece lasts about 23 or 24 minutes. It is in three movements:

Usually translated as:

Debussy called La mer "three symphonic sketches", deliberately avoiding the term symphony. Simon Trezise, in his 1994 book Debussy: La Mer, comments: "He had not composed an orthodox symphony, but neither did he want La mer to be known as a symphonic poem ... [and by calling it] 'Three symphonic sketches' ... [Debussy] must have felt that he had deftly avoided association with either genre." The work has sometimes been called a symphony, including by Debussy himself. It consists of two powerful outer movements framing a lighter, faster piece which acts as a type of scherzo. Jean Barraqué described La mer as the first work to have an "open" form – a devenir sonore or "sonorous becoming... a developmental process in which the very notions of exposition and development coexist in an uninterrupted burst."  Trezise says, "motifs are constantly propagated by derivation from earlier motifs".

Trezise writes that "for much of La Mer, Debussy spurns the more obvious devices associated with the sea, wind, and concomitant storm in favour of his own, highly individual vocabulary". Caroline Potter, in The Cambridge Companion to Debussy, comments that Debussy's depiction of the sea "avoids monotony by using a multitude of water figurations that could be classified as musical onomatopoeia: they evoke the sensation of swaying movement of waves and suggest the pitter-patter of falling droplets of spray" (and so forth), and – significantly – avoid the arpeggiated triads used by Schubert and Wagner to evoke the movement of water. In The Cambridge Companion to Debussy, Mark DeVoto describes La mer as "much more complex than anything Debussy had written earlier", particularly the Nocturnes: 

The author, musicologist and pianist Roy Howat has observed, in his book Debussy in Proportion, that the formal boundaries of La mer correspond exactly to the mathematical ratios called the Golden Section. Trezise finds the intrinsic evidence "remarkable", but cautions that no written or reported evidence suggests that Debussy consciously sought such proportions.

Reception
The premiere was given on 15 October 1905 in Paris by the Orchestre Lamoureux under the direction of Camille Chevillard. The piece was initially not well received. Pierre Lalo, critic of Le Temps, hitherto an admirer of Debussy's work, wrote: "I do not hear, I do not see, I do not smell the sea." Another Parisian critic, Louis Schneider, wrote, "The audience seemed rather disappointed: they expected the ocean, something big, something colossal, but they were served instead with some agitated water in a saucer." When the conductor Karl Muck gave the first American performances of La mer in March 1907, the critic Henry Krehbiel wrote:

The work was not performed in Britain until 1908, when the composer – though a reluctant conductor – gave a performance at the Queen's Hall; the work was enthusiastically reviewed in The Times, but The Observer thought it lacked "real force of elemental strength". The Manchester Guardian thought the work an advance on Debussy's earlier work in some respects, although "the vagueness of thematic outline is carried to hitherto unheard-of lengths", and found "moments of great beauty" in the work; and The Musical Times reserved judgment, but noted that the audience had been highly enthusiastic. Debussy commented that his music was more popular in London than in Paris.

One reason for the negative reception at the Paris premiere may have been public disapproval of Debussy's treatment of his wife, but another was the mediocre performance by the conductor and orchestra. Chevillard was a respected interpreter of the classics, but was not at home with new music. It was not until 1908, at the second performance of the work in Paris, conducted by the composer, that La mer became a success with the public. Trezise records that at the time, many felt the 1908 concert presented the real first performance of the piece.

Although some of Debussy's contemporaries drew analogies between La mer and French Impressionist paintings – much to the composer's irritation – others have detected the influence of his admiration for the English painter J. M. W. Turner and Debussy's choice of Hokusai's c. 1831 woodblock print The Great Wave off Kanagawa for the cover of the printed score indicates the influence of Japanese art on him. Despite Debussy's scorn for the term "impressionism" applied to his or anyone else's music – a matter on which he and Ravel were of the same firm opinion – the term was used by some of his most devoted admirers. His biographer Edward Lockspeiser called La mer "the greatest example of an orchestral Impressionist work", and more recently in The Cambridge Companion to Debussy Nigel Simeone commented, "It does not seem unduly far-fetched to see a parallel in Monet's seascapes".

In the decades after the premiere La mer established itself in the core orchestral repertoire. In 2018 the online archive of the New York Philharmonic Orchestra reported that the orchestra had played the work at 135 concert performances since 1917, under conductors including Willem Mengelberg, Arturo Toscanini, John Barbirolli, Pierre Monteux, Leonard Bernstein, Pierre Boulez and Valery Gergiev. In 1979 The Musical Times rated La mer the composer's most important orchestral work. The pianist Sviatoslav Richter called La mer "A piece that I rank alongside the St Matthew Passion and the Ring cycle as one of my favourite works".

Recordings
The first recording of La mer was made by the Orchestre de la Société des Concerts du Conservatoire, conducted by Piero Coppola in 1928. It has been reissued on LP and CD. Recordings conducted by other musicians who had known and worked with Debussy include those by Monteux and Ernest Ansermet, who both conducted the work on more than one recording. Well known recordings from the monaural era include those by the NBC Symphony Orchestra and Toscanini, and the Philharmonia on recordings conducted by Herbert von Karajan and Guido Cantelli. Of recordings from the stereophonic LP era, The Penguin Guide to Recorded Classical Music singled out those by the Chicago Symphony Orchestra under Fritz Reiner, and the Berlin Philharmonic under Karajan.

Of the many recordings available, a comparative survey for Classic FM (2018) recommended a short list of five, those by the Orchestre National de France and Jean Martinon; the Cleveland Orchestra and Boulez; the Berlin Philharmonic and Simon Rattle; the Seoul Philharmonic and Myung-Whun Chung, and – its top recommendation – the Royal Concertgebouw Orchestra conducted by Bernard Haitink.

Influence
La mer has influenced a number of composers throughout the 20th century. British composers Frank Merrick and Hope Squire arranged La Mer for piano duet and performed it in 1915 in one of their new music recitals. Luciano Berio quoted La mer in the 3rd movement of his 1968 Sinfonia; John Williams used simplified versions of motifs from La mer in the score he wrote for Jaws (1975); and in 2002 the Norwegian composer Biosphere loosely based his ambient album Shenzhou around looped samples of La mer.

Notes, references and sources

Notes

References

Sources

Journal

Books

External links

1905 compositions
Compositions by Claude Debussy
Compositions for symphony orchestra
Maritime music